Hestiasula is a genus of Asian praying mantids in the subfamily Oxypilinae of the family Hymenopodidae.

Species
Hestiasula brachyptera Villani, 2016
Hestiasula brunneriana Saussure, 1871
Hestiasula castetsi Bolivar, 1897
Hestiasula ceylonica Beier, 1956
Hestiasula gyldenstolpei Werner, 1930
Hestiasula kastneri Beier, 1942
Hestiasula masoni Giglio-Tos, 1915
Hestiasula nigrofemorata Werner, 1930
Hestiasula woodi Giglio-Tos, 1915
Hestiasula zhejiangensis Zhou & Shen, 1992

Additional images

See also
List of mantis genera and species
Boxer mantis

References

 
Mantodea genera
Acromantinae
Taxa named by Henri Louis Frédéric de Saussure